The 1995 Dura Lube 500 was the 30th and penultimate stock car race of the 1995 NASCAR Winston Cup Series, the 15th and final race of the 1995 NASCAR Winston West Series, and the eighth iteration of the event. The race was held on Sunday, October 29, 1995, in Avondale, Arizona at Phoenix International Raceway, a 1-mile (1.6 km) permanent low-banked tri-oval race track. The race took the scheduled 312 laps to complete. On the final restart with six to go, Ricky Rudd, driving for his own Rudd Performance Motorsports team, would manage to defend the field to take his 16th career NASCAR Winston Cup Series season, his only victory of the season, and with the win, maintaining a streak of 13 straight seasons with a victory. To fill out the top three, Bobby Allison Motorsports driver Derrike Cope and Richard Childress Racing driver Dale Earnhardt would finish second and third, respectively.

Heading into the final race of the season, the 1995 NAPA 500 at Atlanta Motor Speedway, Hendrick Motorsports driver Jeff Gordon was the heavy favorite to win the championship, only needing a finish of 41st or better to clinch his first NASCAR Winston Cup Series championship. The second-place driver, Richard Childress Racing driver Dale Earnhardt, was 147 points behind Gordon.

Background 

Phoenix International Raceway – also known as PIR – is a one-mile, low-banked tri-oval race track located in Avondale, Arizona. It is named after the nearby metropolitan area of Phoenix. The motorsport track opened in 1964 and currently hosts two NASCAR race weekends annually. PIR has also hosted the IndyCar Series, CART, USAC and the Rolex Sports Car Series. The raceway is currently owned and operated by International Speedway Corporation.

The raceway was originally constructed with a 2.5 mi (4.0 km) road course that ran both inside and outside of the main tri-oval. In 1991 the track was reconfigured with the current 1.51 mi (2.43 km) interior layout. PIR has an estimated grandstand seating capacity of around 67,000. Lights were installed around the track in 2004 following the addition of a second annual NASCAR race weekend.

Entry list 

 (R) denotes rookie driver.

Qualifying 
Qualifying was split into two rounds. The first round was held on Friday, October 27, at 4:00 PM EST. Each driver would have one lap to set a time. During the first round, the top 25 drivers in the round would be guaranteed a starting spot in the race. If a driver was not able to guarantee a spot in the first round, they had the option to scrub their time from the first round and try and run a faster lap time in a second round qualifying run, held on Saturday, October 28, at 3:00 PM EST. As with the first round, each driver would have one lap to set a time. For this specific race, positions 26-38 would be decided on time, and four spots would be determined by NASCAR Winston Cup Series provisionals, while two more additional provisionals would be given to teams in the Winston West Series.

Eight drivers would fail to qualify.

Full qualifying results

Race results

References 

1995 NASCAR Winston Cup Series
NASCAR races at Phoenix Raceway
October 1995 sports events in the United States
1995 in sports in Arizona